Frisco Lake is a small lake in Rolla, Phelps County in the U.S. state of Missouri.

Frisco Lake was both named for and owned by the Frisco Railroad.

References

Bodies of water of Phelps County, Missouri
Lakes of Missouri